Saponaria jagelii is a species of plant in the family Caryophyllaceae. It is endemic to the island of Elafonisos in Greece.  Its natural habitat is dune vegetation. It is threatened by habitat loss.

References

Caryophyllaceae
Critically endangered plants
Endemic flora of Greece
Taxonomy articles created by Polbot